The Juan Fernández tit-tyrant (Anairetes fernandezianus) is a species of bird in the family Tyrannidae. It is endemic to the Juan Fernández Islands in the South Pacific Ocean off Chile. Its natural habitats are subtropical or tropical moist lowland forests, rural gardens, and urban areas. It is threatened by habitat loss.

Taxonomy
The Juan Fernández tit-tyrant's genus, Anairetes, is believed to be most closely related to the genera Mecocerculus and Serpophaga; however, there is no definitive evidence supporting this claim. Members of the genus Anairetes are known commonly as tit-tyrants because their active foraging behavior and crests are reminiscent of the true tits in the family Paridae.

References

Cited texts

External links
Photographs of the Juan Fernandez tit-tyrant

Anairetes
Birds of Chile
Endemic birds of Chile
Endemic fauna of the Juan Fernández Islands
Birds described in 1857
Taxonomy articles created by Polbot